Baldwinton is an unincorporated community in Hillsdale Rural Municipality No. 440, Saskatchewan, Canada. The community is located along Highway 40 approximately 50 km north of the Town of Unity.

See also 
 List of communities in Saskatchewan

References 

Hillsdale No. 440, Saskatchewan
Unincorporated communities in Saskatchewan
Division No. 13, Saskatchewan